The Aston Hippodrome, also known as The Hipp, was a popular theatre in the Aston area of Birmingham, England.

It was opened to the public on 7 December 1908 after the completion of construction at a cost of £10,000. It was designed by James and Lister Lea who had also designed the Bartons Arms public house just a few yards away on the other side of the street.

The theatre was seriously damaged in 1938 by a fire which resulted in a £38,000 refurbishment.

On 4 June 1960, the theatre building ceased performances with the final performance a revue, A to Z of Striptease. The building was renovated into a bingo hall and remained so until its demolition in September 1980. The Drum, an arts centre, is located on the theatre's site.

Performances were held twice daily and amongst these performances were famous acts such as Laurel and Hardy, George Formby, Gracie Fields, Larry Grayson, Morecambe and Wise and Judy Garland who performed there in 1951.

The opening chapter of Ron Dawson's novel, The Last Viking, vividly describes one of the 'strip tease shows' which dominated the Hipp's offerings during the mid to late 1950s. The show was called 'Heatwave' and the scene captures the sad atmosphere of the 'artistic tableaux' which characterised these shows.

References

External links
Birmingham City Council - Information on the theatre
Birmingham City Council - Image of the theatre
Astonbrook through Astonmanor - The Aston Hippodrome performances and management history
Mediahub - Before and after images of present day building

Theatres completed in 1908
Buildings and structures in Birmingham, West Midlands
Former theatres in Birmingham, West Midlands
Demolished buildings and structures in the West Midlands (county)
1908 establishments in England